Cecil William Davidge (28 March 1863 – 16 January 1936) was a professor of English, author and Freemason. Davidge was the father of the barrister and academic Cecil Vere Davidge and grandfather of Olympic rower Christopher Davidge.

Early life
Davidge was born on 28 March 1863 the only son of Frederick William Davidge and his wife, Harriet Julia Frances Ponsonby, daughter of the Major General the Hon. Sir Frederick Cavendish Ponsonby . He was educated at Hurstpierpoint College, followed by University College London where he received a Bachelor of Arts degree in English, and Durham University where he received a Master of Arts degree in English.

Academic career
Following university Davidge headed the United Society Partners in the Gospel mission to Japan from 1898 until 1907 and became a master at the SPG School of Kobe. Following the SPG mission in 1907 he entered the service of the Imperial Japanese Government as Professor of English, University College of Commerce, Kobe, he remained in that position until 1930. During his period as Professor of English, he tutored Hirohito, the future Emperor Shōwa. He was awarded the Order of the Rising Sun, 4th Class; the Order of the Sacred Treasure, 4th Class, until he was promoted to the rank of Chokunin.

Masonic career
As well as his academic work, Davidge was also the founder and Master (late Past Master) of the Lodge Albion in the Far East and a PDGW (Grand Warden) of the District Grand Lodge of Japan.

Literary work
During his time in Japan, Davidge wrote the book Practical Hints for Craftsmen, published in 1910 and republished in 2014 as a book of Historical Interest. Following his retirement from Japan in 1930 he retired to Kingsthorpe, Northamptonshire and helped with the Northamptonshire Record Society.

Family

In 1900 in Kobe, Japan, Davidge married Elsie Hamer, daughter of Henry Hamer of Hamer Hall, Lancashire. The Hamers were an old Lancashire family who settled at Hamer Hall in the 14th century.  The couple had three children together:

 Cecil Vere Davidge (14 February 1901 – 27 January 1981) 
 Cuthbert Roy Davidge  
 Beryl Davidge

Davidge's wife, Elsie died in 1927 in a car accident in Kobe where the taxi she was in was driven off a cliff.

References

External links
Who's Who Page
thepeerage.com page 

1863 births
1936 deaths
People educated at Hurstpierpoint College
Alumni of University College London
People from London
British writers
British academics
British expatriates in Japan
Alumni of Hatfield College, Durham
Durham University Boat Club rowers